Enteromius diamouanganai is a species of ray-finned fish in the genus Enteromius which occurs in rivers in the Congo and Gabon.

Footnotes 

 

Enteromius
Taxa named by Guy G. Teugels
Taxa named by Victor Mamonekene
Fish described in 1992